Christopher "Chris" Chappell (birth unknown) is a former professional rugby league footballer who played in the 1980s. He played at club level for the Featherstone Rovers (Heritage № 615).

Playing career
Christopher Chappell made his début for the Featherstone Rovers on Sunday 27 October 1985.

References

Living people
English rugby league players
Featherstone Rovers players
Rugby league players from Yorkshire
Place of birth missing (living people)
Year of birth missing (living people)